Montecatini may refer to

Places in Italy 

 Montecatini Terme, a municipality in the province of Pistoia in Tuscany
 RB Montecatini Terme, basketball team in the district above
 Battle of Montecatini, 1315 battle near the district above
 Montecatini Val di Cecina, comune in the province of Pisa in Tuscany
 Montecatini, hamlet in the comune of San Martino in Rio

Business 

 Montecatini (company), Italian chemicals combine